Ahmed Afifi may refer to:

 Ahmed Afifi (volleyball) (born 1988), Egyptian volleyball player
 Ahmed Afifi (footballer) (born 1993), Egyptian footballer

See also
 Ahmed Afif (born 1967), Seychellois politician and banker